The porn star martini is a passion-fruit-flavoured cocktail made with vanilla-flavoured vodka, Passoã, passion fruit juice, and lime juice. It is traditionally accompanied by a chilled shot glass of prosecco. The cocktail was created in 2002 by Douglas Ankrah.

It is not a true martini, but is one of many  drinks that incorporate the term martini into their names. 

The porn star martini was reported to be the most ordered cocktail in the United Kingdom in November of 2018.

Origins
The porn star martini was invented by Douglas Ankrah (1970–2021), owner of the LAB London bar in London, United Kingdom, at his bar Townhouse in London in 2002. Ankrah says that the original drink was inspired by a visit to Mavericks Revue Bar Gentlemen's Club, a nude strip club in Cape Town, South Africa.

Name controversy
Although the name has proved controversial, Ankrah denied that he named it a "porn star" martini to be deliberately provocative. In interviews, Ankrah claimed he used the "porn star" name to evoke "a stylish and confident drink...[that's]….pure indulgence, sexy, fun and evocative". Ankrah also denied being a fan of pornography, or idolising any porn stars in particular. 

In 2019, British retailer Marks & Spencer renamed their Porn Star Martini products to Passion Star Martini, following complaints that the name normalised pornography.

See also
 Vodka martini
 List of cocktails

References

Cocktails with vodka
Mixed drinks
Cocktails with lime juice
Cocktails with fruit juice
1999 introductions